Adrian Aas Stien (born 28 October 1992) is a Norwegian former professional cyclist.

Major results

2015
 1st Stage 1 Tour de Bretagne
 3rd Kampioenschap van Vlaanderen
 10th Ronde van Noord-Holland
2016
 Tour de Gironde
1st Points classification
1st Stage 3
 6th Overall Ronde de l'Oise

References

External links

1992 births
Living people
Norwegian male cyclists